Love by Chance may refer to:
Love by Chance (Indian TV series), a 2014 Indian TV series
Love by Chance (Thai TV series), a 2018 Thai TV series